Barefoot Adventure is a soundtrack album of music from Bruce Brown's 1961 surf film of the same name. All the music was composed by saxophonist Bud Shank, performed by him with a small jazz combo, and released on the Pacific Jazz label.

Reception

AllMusic rated the album with 3 stars.

Track listing
All compositions by Bud Shank
 "Barefoot Adventure" - 4:12
 "Shoeless Beach Meeting" - 4:06
 "Jungle Cruise" - 4:43
 "How High the Makaha" - 3:10
 "Well, 'Pon My Soul" - 4:14
 "Ala Moana" - 2:15
 "Bruce Is Loose" - 3:24
 "Dance of the Sea Monsters" - 4:06

Personnel 
Bud Shank - alto saxophone, baritone saxophone
Carmell Jones - trumpet
Bob Cooper - tenor saxophone
Dennis Budimir - guitar
Gary Peacock - bass
Shelly Manne - drums

References 

1961 albums
Pacific Jazz Records albums
Bud Shank albums